Centra is a chain of convenience stores in Ireland.

Centra may also refer to:
 Centra (anatomy), the plural of centrum, the central part of a vertebra
 Centra Gas Manitoba, an energy supplier in Canada
 Centra, a margarine company among those merged in 1927 to form Margarine Unie

See also
 Nissan Sentra, a 1982–present Japanese compact car